The Chief Medical Officer (CMO) for Ireland is the most senior government advisor on health-related matters. It is a government post as the lead medical expert in the Department of Health.

The key responsibilities of the CMO include providing expert medical evidence, especially in public health matters, as well as leading on patient safety issues, emergency planning and other areas.

History
The Government of Ireland appointed Dr James Deeny as its first Chief Medical Adviser in 1944. He was succeeded by Dr Charlie Lysaght who changed the name of the role to its current title of Chief Medical Officer.

List of office-holders

Chief Medical Adviser
Dr James Deeny, 1944–1962
Dr Charlie Lysaght, 1962–1965

Chief Medical Officer
Dr Jim Kiely, 1997–2008
Dr Tony Holohan, 2008–2022
Dr Ronan Glynn , July–October 2020
Professor Breda Smyth, 2022–present

Deputy Chief Medical Officer
 Dr James Walsh, ?–1988
 Dr Tony Holohan, 2001–2008
 Dr Philip Crowley, 2008–2018
 Dr Ronan Glynn, 2018–2022

See also
Chief Medical Officer (United Kingdom)
Chief Public Health Officer of Canada
Medical Officer for Health

References

External links
Department of Health, Ireland

I
Department of Health (Ireland)